The 2013–14 Cypriot First Division was the 75th season of the Cypriot top-level football league. It began on 31 August 2013 and ended on 31 May 2014. APOEL were the defending champions.

The league comprised eleven teams from the 2012–13 season and three promoted teams from the 2012–13 Second Division.

The 17 May 2014 title deciding match between AEL Limassol and APOEL was abandoned (at 0–0) after 52 minutes, when a bomb thrown by AEL fans, hit and injured APOEL's player Kaká. The match was replayed behind closed doors at a neutral stadium on 31 May 2014 and APOEL achieved to win their second consecutive league title after beating AEL Limassol by 1–0. However, on 6 June 2014, the Cyprus Football Association’s (CFA) disciplinary committee – acting as an appeals board – unanimously cancelled on the CFA council’s decision to repeat the 17 May championship final, awarding the match to APOEL with a 0–3 score.

Teams

Promotion and relegation (pre-season)
AEP Paphos and Ayia Napa were relegated at the end of the first stage of the 2012–13 season after finishing in the bottom two places of the table. They were joined by Olympiakos Nicosia, who finished at the bottom of the second-phase Group C.

The relegated teams were replaced by 2012–13 Second Division champions Aris Limassol, runners-up AEK Kouklia and third-placed team Ermis Aradippou.

Stadia and locations

Note: Table lists clubs in alphabetical order.

Personnel and kits
Note: Flags indicate national team as has been defined under FIFA eligibility rules. Players and Managers may hold more than one non-FIFA nationality.

Managerial changes

First phase

League table

Results

Second phase

Championship group

Table

Results

Relegation group

Table

Results

Season statistics

Top scorers
Including matches played on 31 May 2014; Source: Cyprus Football Association

Hat-tricks

 4 Player scored 4 goals.

Scoring
First goal of the season: 13 minutes and 21 seconds –  Robert Stambolziev (AEK Kouklia) against AEK Larnaca (20:13 EET, 31 August 2013)
Fastest goal of the season: 18 seconds –  Césinha (Ermis) against Nea Salamina (24 November 2013)
Latest goal of the season: 97 minutes and 4 seconds –  Roberto Colautti (Anorthosis) against Omonia (31 August 2013)
First scored penalty kick of the season: 48 minutes and 2 seconds –  Pablo Vranjicán (AEK Kouklia) against AEK Larnaca (21:03 EET, 31 August 2013)
First own goal of the season: 56 minutes and 21 seconds –  Diego Gaúcho (AEL) for APOEL (20:24 EET, 14 September 2013)
Most goals scored in a match by one player: 4 goals
 Thuram (Aris) against Nea Salamina (23 April 2014)
 Gonzalo García (Anorthosis) against Doxa (18 January 2014)
 Marcos De Azevedo (Ermis) against Doxa (21 September 2013)
Most scored goals in a single fixture – 28 goals (Fixture 16)
Fixture 16 results: AEK Larnaca 1–1 APOEL, Aris 4–0 AEK Kouklia, Omonia 2–4 Apollon, Ermis 5–1 Doxa, Anorthosis 3–1 Alki, AEL 4–1 Enosis, Nea Salamina 0–1 Ethnikos.
 Highest scoring game: 9 goals
APOEL 8–1 Anorthosis (11 May 2014)
Aris 7–2 AEK Kouklia (4 May 2014)
 Largest winning margin: 7 goals
APOEL 8–1 Anorthosis (11 May 2014)
 Most goals scored in a match by a single team: 8 goals
APOEL 8–1 Anorthosis (11 May 2014)
 Most goals scored by a losing team: 3 goals
AEL 4–3 Anorthosis (26 April 2014)
Nea Salamina 3–4 Aris (23 April 2014)

Discipline
 First yellow card of the season: 31 minutes –  Nuno Assis for Omonia against Anorthosis (19:31 EET, 31 August 2013)
 First red card of the season: 68 minutes –  Ernestas Šetkus for Nea Salamina against Doxa (19:23 EET, 1 September 2013)
 Most yellow cards in a single match: 14
 Doxa 2–0 Aris – 9 for Doxa (Miloš Pavlović, Abel Pereira, Pedro Baquero, Pedrito, Leandro, Carlos Marques, Rodri, Toni, Gleison) and 5 for Aris (Kypros Christoforou, Douglas Reis, Eduardo Pincelli, Emmanuel Okoye, Zoltán Kovács) (11 May 2014)
 Most red cards in a single match: 2
 Anorthosis 1–1 Nea Salamina – 1 for Anorthosis (Grigoris Makos) and 1 for Nea Salamina (Justin Mengolo) (9 March 2014)
 Omonia 3–2 Anorthosis – 1 for Omonia (Anthony Scaramozzino) and 1 for Anorthosis (Dan Alexa) (21 December 2013)
 Aris 0–1 Apollon – 1 for Aris (Charalambos Pittakas) and 1 for Apollon (Giorgos Merkis) (16 December 2013)
 Doxa 1–1 APOEL – 1 for Doxa (Richard Kingson) and 1 for APOEL (Aritz Borda) (23 November 2013)

References

Sources

Cypriot First Division seasons
Cyprus
1